Theta Virginis (θ Vir, θ Virginis) is a multiple star system in the zodiac constellation of Virgo. Based upon parallax measurements, it is about 320 light years from the Sun. The three stars in this system have a combined apparent visual magnitude of 4.37, bright enough to be seen with the naked eye.

The primary component, Theta Virginis Aa, is a white-hued A-type main sequence star with a stellar classification of A1Vs. It is part of a spectroscopic binary whose components, Aa and Ab, have visual magnitudes of +4.49 and +6.83 respectively. The system has an orbital period of about 33.04 years with an eccentricity of 0.9. The brighter member of this pair shows photometric and radial velocity periodicities with a cycle time of 0.7 days, which may indicate its rotation period.

The inner pair is orbited by the 9.4 magnitude B component, at an angular separation of 7.1 arcseconds.  A fourth component C, 69.6 arcseconds away, has an apparent magnitude of 10.4. However, component C is an optical companion: it is physically unrelated and only appears close in the sky.

References

External links
 
 

Virginis, Theta
Virgo (constellation)
Triple star systems
A-type main-sequence stars
Spectroscopic binaries
Virginis, 051
064238
4963
114330
Durchmusterung objects